Johann Jacob Baeyer (born 5 November 1794 in Berlin, died 10 September 1885 in Berlin) was a German geodesist and a lieutenant-general in the Royal Prussian Army. He was the first director of the Royal Prussian Geodetic Institute and is regarded as the founder of the International Association of Geodesy. He was the father of the Nobel Prize–winning chemist Adolf von Baeyer. Baeyer was a Lutheran.

See also 

 History of the metre
 Seconds pendulum

References 

German geodesists
Lieutenant generals of Prussia
German Lutherans
1794 births
1885 deaths
19th-century Lutherans
Members of the Göttingen Academy of Sciences and Humanities
Military personnel from Berlin